"Cayendo" is a song by Frank Ocean, released as a 7-inch single on March 25, 2020, concurrently with "Dear April". It consists of an "acoustic" version as side A, and a remix by Sango as side B. The acoustic version was released on digital platforms on April 3. Ocean wrote the song, and co-produced it with Daniel Aged.

Background and release
In October 2019,  Ocean made the 7-inch singles for "Cayendo" and "Dear April" available to pre-order on his website, after previewing Sango's remix of the track at his PrEP+ club night. On March 25, both vinyls began to ship, with the acoustic A-side being released on digital platforms on April 3.

Composition
The track was written by Ocean, and produced by Ocean and Daniel Aged. The R&B ballad has been described as "emotional" and "heart-wrenching", with lyrics sung in both Spanish and English. The track's title translates to "Falling" in English.

Track listing

Charts

References

2020 singles
2020 songs
Frank Ocean songs
Songs written by Frank Ocean
Spanglish songs